Fran Goldthorp (born 11 January 2003) is an  international rugby league footballer who plays at domestic level for Leeds Rhinos Women in the Women's Super League primarily as a  or on the . Goldthorp who is a student at Loughborough University also plays rugby union for Loughborough Lightning in the Premier 15s.

Early and personal life
Born in Leeds, West Yorkshire, Goldthorp played rugby union and cricket at junior level including captaining the Yorkshire Cricket Board under-15 team as they won the County Championship in 2018. Her brother Eliot is a footballer.

Club career
Goldthorp's first rugby league experience came with Guiseley Rangers which brought her to the attention of the Leeds Rhinos, who signed her the club's under-19 squad.

Aged only 16, Goldthorp made her first team debut for the Rhinos against Castleford in a Women's Super League match on 28 April 2019. In the 2019 Women's Challenge Cup final, also against Castleford, Goldthorp scored a try as Leeds retained the cup.  Goldthorp ended the debut season with two tries in the Grand Final, another meeting with Castleford.

With the 2020 season cancelled due to the COVID-19 pandemic it was 2021 before Goldthorp played again. Although the Rhinos did not win any trophies during the 2021 season, Goldthorp set a new club try-scoring record with 20 tries in 12 games. Goldthorp was nominated for the Woman of Steel award, losing out to Jodie Cunningham.

In 2022 Goldthorp scored 13 tries in 15 appearances to help Leeds reach the final of the Challenge Cup and was in the team that beat York City Knights 12–4 in the Grand Final.

International career
Goldthorp's abilities were recognised with a call-up to the England squad and she made her international debut against  on 26 June 2021, celebrating the occasion with her first international try. 2021 ended with a second England appearance, against  in October.

2022 saw two more England appearances in the mid-season games, against France and Wales, scoring a try against France and two against Wales.

In September 2022, Goldthorp was named in the England squad for the World Cup to be held in November 2022.

References

2003 births
Living people
England women's national rugby league team players
English female rugby league players
English female rugby union players
Leeds Rhinos Women players
Loughborough Lightning
Rugby league centres
Rugby league players from Leeds
Rugby league wingers
Rugby league fullbacks
Rugby union fullbacks